Forrest Deon Hightower (born March 15, 1992) is a former gridiron football defensive back. He played college football at San Jose State.

College career
Hightower played college football at San Jose State University from 2010–2014.

Professional career
After two seasons with the Ottawa Redblacks of the Canadian Football League (CFL), Hightower signed a reserve/future contract with the Saints on January 4, 2017. He was waived by the Saints on May 22, 2017.

Hightower retired from football on June 30, 2021.

References

External links
San Jose State Spartans bio

Living people
1992 births
Players of American football from California
Sportspeople from the San Francisco Bay Area
American football defensive backs
Canadian football defensive backs
American players of Canadian football
Ottawa Redblacks players
People from Concord, California
New Orleans Saints players
Edmonton Elks players